The Tigers Have Spoken is a 2004 live album by Neko Case. The album was recorded at several live shows in Chicago and Toronto in the spring of 2004. Neko's backing band featured The Sadies and Jon Rauhouse. Guest performers included Carolyn Mark, Kelly Hogan, Jim & Jennie and the Pinetops, Paul Morstad and Brian Connelly. The album was produced by Case and Darryl Neudorf.

The album consists of a combination of Case originals and cover songs such as the Nervous Eaters' "Loretta", The Shangri-Las' "The Train From Kansas City", and Loretta Lynn's "Rated X". It marked a return to the alternative country sound which Case had moved away from after her first two solo albums.

Track listing
"If You Knew"  – 2:30 - (Neko Case, Sadies)
"Soulful Shade of Blue"  – 2:33 - (Buffy Ste. Marie)
"Hex"  – 4:59 - (Catherine Ann Irwin)
"The Train from Kansas City"  – 3:25 - (Jeff Barry, Ellie Greenwich)
"The Tigers Have Spoken"  – 2:41 - (Case, Sadies)
"Blacklisted"  – 2:11 - (Case)
"Loretta"  – 2:09 - (Steve Cataldo)
"Favorite"  – 3:36 - (Case)
"Rated X"  – 2:49 - (Loretta Lynn)
"This Little Light"  – 3:00 - (Traditional)
"Wayfaring Stranger"  – 3:16 - (Traditional)
"Tigers Are Noble"  – 1:07 (hidden track)

References

Neko Case live albums
The Sadies albums
2004 live albums
Collaborative albums
Anti- (record label) live albums
Albums produced by Darryl Neudorf